is a railway station on the Iida Line in Tenryū-ku, Hamamatsu, Shizuoka Prefecture, Japan, operated by Central Japan Railway Company (JR Central).

Lines
Ōzore Station is served by the Iida Line and is 80.8 kilometers from the starting point of the line at Toyohashi Station.

Station layout
Ōzore Station has one ground level island platform connected to a small brick station building modeled after Tokyo Station by a level crossing. The station is not attended.

Platforms

Adjacent stations

Station history
Ōzore Station was established on December 29, 1936 as a station on the now-defunct Sanshin Railway. and as the main station for the residents of former Tomiyama village. On August 1, 1943, the Sanshin Railway was nationalized along with several other local lines to form the Iida line. All freight services were discontinued in December 1971 and the station has been unmanned since February 1984. Along with the division and privatization of JNR on April 1, 1987, the station came under the control and operation of the Central Japan Railway Company. A new station building was completed on August 20, 1997.

Passenger statistics
In fiscal 2016, the station was used by an average of 20 passengers daily (boarding passengers only).

Surrounding area
The station is located at the exit of the Ohara Tunnel (5,063 meters), and the switch point for the station is located within the tunnel.

See also
 List of railway stations in Japan

References

External links

Iida Line station information 

Stations of Central Japan Railway Company
Iida Line
Railway stations in Japan opened in 1936
Railway stations in Shizuoka Prefecture
Railway stations in Hamamatsu